Five by Five is an EP by Japanese pop band Pizzicato Five. It was released in the United States on July 19, 1994 by Matador Records, serving as the band's debut American release for the label. Five by Five was voted the best EP of 1994 in The Village Voices year-end Pazz & Jop critics' poll.

Track listing

Notes
 "Baby Love Child" (LA English Mix version) and "This Year's Girl #2" feature re-recorded English vocals.

References

External links
 

1994 EPs
Pizzicato Five EPs
Matador Records EPs
Japanese-language EPs